Adrienne Arsht Center station, formerly Omni station, is a Metromover station in the Arts & Entertainment District neighborhood of Downtown, Miami, Florida, United States. The station is adjacent to the Adrienne Arsht Center for the Performing Arts, just west of The Miami Herald building and the Venetian Causeway, and directly south of the MacArthur Causeway.

This station is located near the intersection of Northeast 15th Avenue and Biscayne Boulevard (U.S. 1). It opened to service May 26, 1994, as Omni station.

Station layout

Places of interest
Arts & Entertainment District
Adrienne Arsht Center for the Performing Arts
Omni Hotel
The Grand Doubletree
Opera Tower
Platinum on the Bay
Trinity Episcopal Church 
One Herald Plaza (The Miami Herald Building) 
Miami International University of Art & Design
Biscayne Bay Marriott International
Crowne Plaza Hotel 
Hotel Grand Prix 
Quantum Towers
The Chelsea Tower
1490 Biscayne Building
Soleil Tower and Complex
Urbana Tower
Plaza Venetia Hotel
Miami Beach and Venetian Islands (via MacArthur Causeway and Venetian Causeway)

External links
 
 MDT – Metromover Stations
 entrance from Google Maps Street View

Metromover stations
Railway stations in the United States opened in 1994
1994 establishments in Florida
Omni Loop